Harry Howard (1930–2000) was an Australian landscape architect, and one of the first members of the Australian Institute of Landscape Architects (AILA).

Howard had no formal training in landscape architecture, graduating from the University of Sydney with a degree in architecture. A devotee of the modernist style of architecture, Howard counted Ludwig Mies van der Rohe and Le Corbusier among his influences, and later became friends with Sydney architect of the modernist style, Harry Seidler.

External links
 Australian Institute of Landscape Architects biography
 Lane Cove Streetscapes
 The High Court of Australia at the Australian Heritage Database

Australian landscape architects
Architects from Sydney
1930 births
2000 deaths